Pavel Novotný may refer to:
 Pavel Novotný (footballer), Czech footballer
 Pavel Novotný (politician), Czech politician
 , Czech porn actor